The 1924 Humboldt State Lumberjacks football team represented Humboldt State College during the 1924 college football season. They competed as an independent.

1924 was the first year for Humboldt State football and they only played one game. The team was led by head coach Bert Smith in his only year as coach.

Schedule

References

Humboldt State
Humboldt State Lumberjacks football seasons
College football undefeated seasons
Humboldt State Lumberjacks football